William Randolph Woodson (born 1957) is an American plant physiologist and university administrator. He is the fourteenth and current chancellor of North Carolina State University.

Personal life and education
Woodson was raised in Fordyce, Arkansas. He is married to Susan Wynne Woodson, and they have three adult children.

Woodson received his B.S. in horticulture from the University of Arkansas and then earned his M.S. in horticulture and Ph.D. in horticulture and plant physiology at Cornell University.

Career
Woodson began his teaching career as an assistant professor at Louisiana State University in 1983. He was on the faculty at Louisiana State until 1985, when he joined the faculty at Purdue University. At Purdue, Woodson served as both the director of the plant biology program and as the head of the Department of Horticulture and Landscape Architecture from 1995 to 1998. Then he became the associate dean of the College of Agriculture and director of the Office of Agricultural Research Programs. He served in that position until 2004 when he was made the Glenn W. Sample Dean of Agriculture. In 2008, Woodson was named Purdue's provost and executive vice president for academic affairs.

In 2010, Woodson succeeded Interim Chancellor James H. Woodward to become the fourteenth chancellor of North Carolina State University, the largest university in North Carolina. One of Woodson's first acts at NC State was to initiate the formulation of a ten-year strategic plan for the university. The result – The Pathway to the Future: NC State's 2011-2020 Strategic Plan – is the framework that guides university administrators in long- and short-term decision-making. It was approved by the NC State Board of Trustees on April 22, 2011.

As part of this plan, Woodson led efforts to expand interdisciplinary research at NC State through programs such as the Chancellor's Faculty Excellence Program, which centers on hiring clusters of faculty to collaborate in addressing global challenges from different perspectives, and the University Faculty Scholars program, which recognizes the university's leaders in academics and research.

Under Woodson, NC State received the two largest gifts in its history. In 2010, Lonnie C. Poole Jr. and his wife, Carol Johnson Poole, gave the university $40 million, which increased NC State's endowment by 10 percent. The majority of the gift was designated for what is now the Poole College of Management. Support was also designated for the College of Humanities and Social Sciences and for the construction of a clubhouse at NC State's golf course on Centennial Campus. In 2013, the Park Foundation donated $50 million to begin an endowment that will provide permanent funding for the university's existing Park Scholarships program.

Woodson was elected chairman of the Association of Public and Land-grant Universities for the 2013-2014 year.

Research
Woodson's research focuses on the biochemical and molecular bases of plant aging and the role that ethylene plays in these processes. His research has resulted in the development of molecular approaches to improve post-harvest storage and shipping of horticultural products.

Awards
 Triangle Business Journal Top 100 Business Leaders
 Indiana Crop Improvement Association Distinguished Service
 Sagamore of the Wabash, presented by Governor of Indiana for distinguished service to the state
 American Society for Horticultural Science Outstanding Scientific Publication Award
 United States Department of Agriculture B.Y. Morrison Memorial Award

References

External links 
 Office of the Chancellor - NC State University

Living people
Chancellors of North Carolina State University
Purdue University faculty
People from Fordyce, Arkansas
Louisiana State University faculty
University of Arkansas alumni
1957 births
American university and college faculty deans